Paolo Trisciani (born 26 January 1952) is an Italian rower. He competed in the men's coxed four event at the 1976 Summer Olympics.

References

1952 births
Living people
Italian male rowers
Olympic rowers of Italy
Rowers at the 1976 Summer Olympics
Place of birth missing (living people)